The 1963 World Table Tennis Championships women's singles was the 27th edition of the women's singles championship.
Kimiyo Matsuzaki defeated Maria Alexandru in the final by three sets to two, to win the title.

Results

See also
List of World Table Tennis Championships medalists

References

-
1963 in women's table tennis